Slaty flycatcher may refer to:

 Vanikoro monarch, a species of flycatcher found in the Solomon Islands
 Slaty monarch, a species of flycatcher found in Fiji

Birds by common name